Group B of the 2000 Fed Cup World Group was one of three pools in the World Group of the 2000 Fed Cup. Four teams competed in a round robin competition, with the top team advancing to the knockout stage.

Czech Republic vs. Austria

Switzerland vs. Slovakia

Czech Republic vs. Switzerland

Switzerland vs. Austria

Czech Republic vs. Slovakia

Austria vs. Slovakia

See also
Fed Cup structure

References

External links
 Fed Cup website

2000 Fed Cup World Group